Kanika (Marathi : "कनिका") is an Indian revenge/horror film directed by Pushkar Manohar, Featuring Sharad Ponkshe in the lead role. The film was released on 31 March 2017.

Cast
Sharad Ponkshe
Chaitrali Gupte
Kamlakar Saatpute
Aananda Karekar
Falguni Rajni
Vandana Marathe
Nilesh Behere

References

External links
 
 
 
 
 
 
 
 
 
 

2017 films
2017 horror films
Indian horror films
2010s Marathi-language films
Indian films about revenge